Serhiy Artiukh (born 29 July 1985 in Donetsk) is a Ukrainian football player who plays as a forward.

He previously played for Ravan Baku.

External links
Statistics at FFU website

Ukrainian footballers
Ukrainian footballers banned from domestic competitions
Ukrainian expatriate footballers
1985 births
Living people
FC Vorskla Poltava players
Expatriate footballers in Azerbaijan
Simurq PIK players
Ravan Baku FC players
Association football forwards
FC Naftovyk-Ukrnafta Okhtyrka players
FC Inhulets Petrove players
Ukrainian expatriate sportspeople in Azerbaijan
Footballers from Donetsk